This list is based on the Handbook of Australian, New Zealand and Antarctic Birds list, May 2002 update, with the doubtfuls omitted. It includes the birds of Australia, New Zealand, Antarctica, and the surrounding ocean and subantarctic islands.

Australian call-ups are based on the List of Australian birds.
New Zealand call-ups are based on the List of New Zealand birds.

Struthioniiformes

Casuariidae 
Emu, Dromaius novaehollandiae - Aus
Southern cassowary, Casuarius casuarius - Aus

Apterygidae 
Brown kiwi, Apteryx australis - NZ
Little spotted kiwi, Apteryx owenii - NZ
Great spotted kiwi, Apteryx haastii - NZ

Podicipediformes

Podicipedidae 
Australasian grebe, Tachybaptus novaehollandiae - Aus, NZ
Hoary-headed grebe, Poliocephalus poliocephalus - Aus, NZ
New Zealand dabchick, Poliocephalus rufopectus - NZ
Great crested grebe, Podiceps cristatus - Aus, NZ

Sphenisciformes

Spheniscidae 
King penguin, Aptenodytes patagonicus - Aus, NZ
Emperor penguin, Aptenodytes forsteri - Aus, NZ
Gentoo penguin, Pygoscelis papua - Aus, NZ
Adelie penguin, Pygoscelis adeliae - Aus, NZ
Chinstrap penguin, Pygoscelis antarctica - Aus, NZ
Southern rockhopper penguin, Eudyptes chrysocome - Aus, NZ
Northern rockhopper penguin, Eudyptes moseleyi - NZ
Fiordland penguin, Eudyptes pachyrhynchus - Aus, NZ
Snares penguin, Eudyptes robustus - Aus, NZ
Erect-crested penguin, Eudyptes sclateri - Aus, NZ
Macaroni penguin, Eudyptes chrysolophus - Aus, NZ
Yellow-eyed penguin, Megadyptes antipodes - NZ
Little penguin, Eudyptula minor - Aus, NZ
Magellanic penguin, Spheniscus magellanicus - Aus, NZ

Procellariiformes

Diomedeidae 
Wandering albatross, Diomedea exulans - NZ
Royal albatross, Diomedea epomophora - NZ
Black-footed albatross, Phoebastria nigripes - NZ
Black-browed albatross, Thalassarche melanophris - Aus, NZ
Shy albatross, Thalassarche cauta - NZ
Salvin's albatross, Thalassarche salvini - Aus, NZ
Grey-headed albatross, Thalassarche chrysostoma - Aus, NZ
Indian yellow-nosed albatross, Thalassarche carteri - Aus, NZ
Buller's albatross, Thalassarche bulleri - NZ
Sooty albatross, Phoebetria fusca - NZ
Light-mantled sooty albatross, Phoebetria palpebrata - NZ

Procellariidae 
Southern giant petrel, Macronectes giganteus - NZ
Northern giant petrel, Macronectes halli - NZ
Southern fulmar, Fulmarus glacialoides - Aus, NZ
Antarctic petrel, Thalassoica antarctica - NZ
Cape petrel, Daption capense - Aus, NZ
Snow petrel, Pagodroma nivea - NZ
Kerguelen petrel, Lugensa brevirostris - Aus, NZ
Tahiti petrel, Pseudobulweria rostrata - Aus, NZ
Great-winged petrel, Pterodroma macroptera - NZ
White-headed petrel, Pterodroma lessonii - NZ
Providence petrel, Pterodroma solandri - Aus, 
Magenta petrel, Pterodroma magentae
Kermadec petrel, Pterodroma neglecta - Aus, NZ
Herald petrel, Pterodroma arminjoniana - Aus
Phoenix petrel, Pterodroma alba - NZ
Soft-plumaged petrel, Pterodroma mollis - Aus, NZ
Mottled petrel, Pterodroma inexpectata - Aus, NZ
Juan Fernandez petrel, Pterodroma externa - Aus, NZ
White-necked petrel, Pterodroma cervicalis - Aus, NZ
Barau's petrel, Pterodroma baraui - Aus
Black-winged petrel, Pterodroma nigripennis - Aus, NZ
Chatham petrel, Pterodroma axillaris - NZ
Cook's petrel, Pterodroma cookii - NZ
Stejneger's petrel, Pterodroma longirostris - NZ
Pycroft's petrel, Pterodroma pycrofti - NZ
Gould's petrel, Pterodroma leucoptera - Aus, NZ
Blue petrel, Halobaena caerulea - Aus, NZ
Broad-billed prion, Pachyptila vittata - Aus, NZ
Salvin's prion, Pachyptila salvini - Aus, NZ
Antarctic prion, Pachyptila desolata - Aus, NZ
Slender-billed prion, Pachyptila belcheri - Aus, NZ
Fairy prion, Pachyptila turtur - Aus, NZ
Fulmar prion, Pachyptila crassirostris - Aus, NZ
Bulwer's petrel, Bulweria bulwerii - 
White-chinned petrel, Procellaria aequinoctialis - Aus, NZ
Westland petrel, Procellaria westlandica - NZ
Black petrel, Procellaria parkinsoni - NZ
Grey petrel, Procellaria cinerea - Aus, NZ
Cory's shearwater, Calonectris borealis - NZ
Streaked shearwater, Calonectris leucomelas - Aus, NZ
Wedge-tailed shearwater, Ardenna pacificus - Aus, NZ
Buller's shearwater, Ardenna bulleri - NZ
Flesh-footed shearwater, Ardenna carneipes - Aus, NZ
Pink-footed shearwater, Ardenna creatopus - Aus, NZ
Great shearwater, Ardenna gravis - Aus, NZ
Sooty shearwater, Ardenna griseus - Aus, NZ
Short-tailed shearwater, Ardenna tenuirostris - Aus, NZ
Christmas shearwater, Puffinus nativitatis - NZ
Manx shearwater, Puffinus puffinus - Aus, NZ
Fluttering shearwater, Puffinus gavia - NZ
Hutton's shearwater, Puffinus huttoni - NZ
Little shearwater, Puffinus assimilis - Aus, NZ

Procellariidae 
South Georgian diving petrel, Pelecanoides georgicus - Aus, NZ
Common diving petrel, Pelecanoides urinatrix - Aus, NZ

Hydrobatidae 
Wilson's storm petrel, Oceanites oceanicus - Aus, NZ
Grey-backed storm petrel, Garrodia nereis - Aus, NZ
White-faced storm petrel, Pelagodroma marina - Aus, NZ
Kermadec storm petrel, Pelagodroma marina - NZ
New Zealand storm petrel, Fregetta maoriana - NZ
Black-bellied storm petrel, Fregetta tropica - Aus, NZ
White-bellied storm petrel, Fregetta grallaria - Aus, NZ
Leach's storm petrel, Oceanodroma leucorhoa - Aus, NZ
Matsudaira's storm petrel, Oceanodroma matsudairae - Aus

Suliformes

Sulidae 
Cape gannet, Morus capensis - Aus, NZ
Australasian gannet, Morus serrator - Aus, NZ
Masked booby, Sula dactylatra - Aus, NZ
Red-footed booby, Sula sula - Aus, NZ
Brown booby, Sula leucogaster - Aus, NZ
Abbott's booby, Papasula abbotti - Aus, NZ

Anhingidae 
Australasian darter, Anhinga novaehollandiae - Aus, NZ

Phalacrocoracidae 
Little pied cormorant, Microcarbo melanoleucos - Aus, NZ
Great cormorant, Phalacrocorax carbo - Aus, NZ
Pied cormorant, Phalacrocorax varius - Aus, NZ
Little black cormorant, Phalacrocorax sulcirostris - Aus, NZ
Black-faced cormorant, Phalacrocorax fuscescens - Aus
Spotted shag, Phalacrocorax punctatus - NZ
Pitt shag, Phalacrocorax featherstoni - NZ
King shag, Phalacrocorax carunculatus - NZ
Otago shag, Phalacrocorax chalconotus - NZ
Foveaux shag, Phalacrocorax stewarti - NZ
Chatham shag, Phalacrocorax onslowi - NZ
Auckland shag, Phalacrocorax colensoi - NZ
Campbell shag, Phalacrocorax campbelli - NZ
Bounty shag, Phalacrocorax ranfurlyi - NZ
Macquarie shag, Phalacrocorax purpurascens - Aus
Heard Island shag, Phalacrocorax nivalis - Aus
Kerguelen shag, Leucocarbo verrucosus - NZ

Fregatidae 
Great frigatebird, Fregata minor - Aus, NZ
Lesser frigatebird, Fregata ariel - Aus, NZ
Christmas frigatebird, Fregata andrewsi - Aus, NZ

Phaethontiformes

Phaethontidae 
Red-tailed tropicbird, Phaethon rubricauda - Aus, NZ
White-tailed tropicbird, Phaethon lepturus - Aus, NZ

Pelecaniformes

Pelecanidae 
Australian pelican, Pelecanus conspicillatus - Aus, NZ

Ardeidae 
White-necked heron, Ardea pacifica - Aus, NZ
Great-billed heron, Ardea sumatrana - Aus, NZ
Eastern great egret, Ardea modesta - Aus, NZ
Pied heron, Ardea picata - Aus
Intermediate egret, Ardea intermedia - Aus, NZ
Swinhoe's egret, Egretta eulophotes
Cattle egret, Ardea ibis - Aus, NZ
White-faced heron, Egretta novaehollandiae - Aus, NZ
Little egret, Egretta garzetta - Aus, NZ
Eastern reef egret, Egretta sacra - Aus, NZ
Striated heron, Butorides striatus - Aus
Black-crowned night heron, Nycticorax nycticorax - Aus
Nankeen night heron, Nycticorax caledonicus - Aus, NZ
Malayan night heron, Gorsachius melanolophus - Aus
Australian little bittern, Ixobrychus dubius - Aus, NZ
New Zealand little bittern, Ixobrychus novaezelandiae - NZ, extinct
Yellow bittern, Ixobrychus sinensis - Aus
Black bittern, Ixobrychus flavicollis - Aus
Australasian bittern, Botaurus poiciloptilus - Aus, NZ

Threskiornithidae 
Glossy ibis, Plegadis falcinellus - Aus, NZ
Australian white ibis, Threskiornis moluccus - Aus, NZ
Straw-necked ibis, Threskiornis spinicollis - Aus, NZ
Royal spoonbill, Platalea regia - Aus, NZ
Yellow-billed spoonbill, Platalea flavipes - Aus, NZ

Ciconiiformes

Ciconiidae 
White stork, Ciconia ciconia - NZ
Black-necked stork, Ephippiorhynchus asiaticus - Aus

Phoenicopteriformes

Phoenicopteridae 
Greater flamingo, Phoenicopterus ruber - Aus, rare vagrant

Anseriformes

Anseranatidae 
Magpie goose, Anseranas semipalmata - Aus

Anatidae 
Plumed whistling duck, Dendrocygna eytoni - Aus, NZ
Wandering whistling duck, Dendrocygna arcuata - Aus
Argentine ruddy duck, Oxyura vittata
Blue-billed duck, Oxyura australis - Aus, NZ
Musk duck, Biziura lobata - Aus
Freckled duck, Stictonetta naevosa - Aus
Mute swan, Cygnus olor - Aus, NZ
Black swan, Cygnus atratus - Aus, NZ
Canada goose, Branta canadensis - Aus, NZ
Cape Barren goose, Cereopsis novaehollandiae - Aus, NZ
Paradise shelduck, Tadorna variegata - NZ
Australian shelduck, Tadorna tadornoides - Aus, NZ
Radjah shelduck, Tadorna radjah - Aus
Green pygmy goose, Nettapus pulchellus - Aus
Cotton pygmy goose, Nettapus coromandelianus - Aus
Australian wood duck, Chenonetta jubata - Aus
Pink-eared duck, Malacorhynchus membranaceus - Aus, NZ
Blue duck, Hymenolaimus malacorhynchus - NZ
Chiloe widgeon, Anas sibilatrix - NZ
Chilean teal, Anas flavirostris
Grey teal, Anas gibberifrons - Aus, NZ
Chestnut teal, Anas castanea - Aus
Brown teal, Anas chlorotis - NZ
Auckland teal, Anas aucklandica - NZ
Campbell teal, Anas nesiotis - NZ
Northern pintail, Anas acuta - Aus, NZ
Brown pintail, Anas georgica
Eaton's pintail, Anas eatoni
Mallard, Anas platyrhynchos - Aus
Pacific black duck, Anas superciliosa - Aus, NZ
Garganey, Anas querquedula - Aus
Blue-winged teal, Anas discors
Australasian shoveller, Anas rhynchotis - Aus
Northern shoveller, Anas clypeata - Aus
Hardhead, Aythya australis - Aus, NZ
New Zealand scaup, Aythya novaeseelandiae - NZ
New Zealand merganser, Mergus australis - NZ

Accipitriformes

Accipitridae 
Pacific baza, Aviceda subcristata - Aus, NZ
Black-shouldered kite, Elanus axillaris - Aus
Letter-winged kite, Elanus scriptus - Aus
Black kite, Milvus migrans - Aus, NZ
Brahminy kite, Haliastur indus - Aus
Whistling kite, Haliastur sphenurus - Aus
White-bellied sea eagle, Haliaeetus leucogaster - Aus, NZ
Spotted harrier, Circus assimilis - Aus, NZ
Swamp harrier, Circus approximans - Aus, NZ
Grey goshawk, Accipiter novaehollandiae - Aus
Brown goshawk, Accipiter fasciatus - Aus
Collared sparrowhawk, Accipiter cirrocephalus - Aus, NZ
Gurney's eagle, Aquila gurneyi - Aus
Wedge-tailed eagle, Aquila audax - Aus, NZ
Little eagle, Hieraaetus morphnoides - Aus
Black-breasted buzzard, Hamirostra melanosternon - Aus, NZ
Square-tailed kite, Lophoictinia isura - Aus
Red goshawk, Erythrotriorchis radiatus - Aus

Pandionidae 
Osprey, Pandion haliaetus - Aus, NZ

Falconiformes

Falconidae 
Brown falcon, Falco berigora - Aus, NZ
Nankeen kestrel, Falco cenchroides - Aus, NZ
Australian hobby, Falco longipennis - Aus, NZ
New Zealand falcon, Falco novaeseelandiae - NZ
Grey falcon, Falco hypoleucos - Aus
Black falcon, Falco subniger - Aus, NZ
Peregrine falcon, Falco peregrinus - Aus, NZ

Galliformes

Megapodiidae 
Orange-footed scrubfowl, Megapodius reinwardt - Aus
Malleefowl, Leipoa ocellata - Aus
Australian brush-turkey, Alectura lathami - Aus

Phasianidae 
Wild turkey, Meleagris gallopavo - Aus, NZ, introduced

Odontophoridae 
California quail, Callipepla californica - Aus, introduced

Phasianidae 
Red junglefowl, Gallus gallus - Aus, introduced
Indian peafowl, Pavo cristatus - Aus, NZ, introduced
Common pheasant, Phasianus colchicus - Aus, NZ, introduced
Chukar, Alectoris chukar - NZ, introduced
Stubble quail, Coturnix pectoralis - Aus
New Zealand quail, Coturnix novaezelandiae - NZ, extinct
Brown quail, Coturnix ypsilophora - Aus, NZ
King quail, Coturnix chinensis - Aus

Gruiformes

Gruidae 
Sarus crane, Grus antigone - Aus
Brolga, Grus rubicunda - Aus

Rallidae 
Red-necked crake, Rallina tricolor - Aus
Red-legged crake, Rallina fasciata - Aus
Buff-banded rail, Gallirallus philippensis - Aus
Weka, Gallirallus australis - NZ
Lord Howe woodhen, Gallirallus sylvestris - Aus
Chatham Island rail, Gallirallus modestus - NZ, extinct
Lewin's rail, Rallus pectoralis - Aus
Plain bush-hen, Amaurornis olivaceus - Aus
Baillon's crake, Porzana pusilla - Aus
Australian spotted crake, Porzana fluminea - Aus
Ruddy-breasted crake, Porzana fusca - Aus
Spotless crake, Porzana tabuensis - Aus
White-browed crake, Porzana cinerea - Aus
Chestnut rail, Eulabeornis castaneoventris - Aus
Watercock, Gallicrex cinerea - Aus
Purple gallinule, Porphyrio martinicus
Australasian swamphen, Porphyrio melanotus - Aus, NZ
Takahe, Porphyrio mantelli - NZ
Dusky moorhen, Gallinula tenebrosa - Aus
Black-tailed nativehen, Tribonyx ventralis - Aus
Tasmanian nativehen, Tribonyx mortierii - Aus
Eurasian coot, Fulica atra - Aus

Otidiformes

Otididae 
Australian bustard, Ardeotis australis - Aus

Charadriiformes

Turnicidae 
Red-backed buttonquail, Turnix maculosa - Aus
Painted buttonquail, Turnix varius - Aus
Chestnut-backed buttonquail, Turnix castanota - Aus
Buff-breasted buttonquail, Turnix olivii - Aus
Black-breasted buttonquail, Turnix melanogaster - Aus
Little buttonquail, Turnix velox - Aus
Red-chested buttonquail, Turnix pyrrhothorax - Aus

Pedionomidae 
Plains-wanderer, Pedionomus torquatus - Aus

Rostratulidae 
Australian painted-snipe, Rostratula australis - Aus

Jacanidae 
Comb-crested jacana, Irediparra gallinacea - Aus
Pheasant-tailed jacana, Hydrophasianus chirurgus - Aus

Chionididae 
Pale-faced sheathbill, Chionis alba
Black-faced sheathbill, Chionis minor - Aus

Burhinidae 
Bush stone-curlew, Burhinus grallarius - Aus
Beach stone-curlew, Esacus magnirostris - Aus

Haematopodidae 
Pied oystercatcher, Haematopus longirostris - Aus
South Island pied oystercatcher, Haematopus finschi - Aus, NZ
Chatham Island oystercatcher, Haematopus chathamensis - NZ
Sooty oystercatcher, Haematopus fuliginosus - Aus
Variable oystercatcher, Haematopus unicolor - NZ

Recurvirostridae 
Black-winged stilt, Himantopus himantopus - Aus
Black stilt, Himantopus novaezelandiae - NZ
Banded stilt, Cladorhynchus leucocephalus - Aus
Red-necked avocet, Recurvirostra novaehollandiae - Aus

Charadriidae 
Pacific golden plover, Pluvialis fulva - Aus
American golden plover, Pluvialis dominica
Grey plover, Pluvialis squatarola - Aus
New Zealand dotterel, Charadrius obscurus - NZ
Ringed plover, Charadrius hiaticula - Aus
Little ringed plover, Charadrius dubius - Aus
Kentish plover, Charadrius alexandrinus - Aus
Red-capped plover, Charadrius ruficapillus - Aus
Double-banded plover, Charadrius bicinctus - Aus
Lesser sand plover, Charadrius mongolus - Aus
Greater sand plover, Charadrius leschenaultii - Aus
Caspian plover, Charadrius asiaticus - Aus
Oriental plover, Charadrius veredus - Aus
Inland dotterel, Charadrius australis - Aus
Three-banded plover, Charadrius tricollaris
Black-fronted dotterel, Elseyornis melanops - Aus
Hooded plover, Thinornis cucullatus - Aus
Shore plover, Thinornis novaeseelandiae - NZ
Wrybill, Anarhynchus frontalis - NZ
Red-kneed dotterel, Erythrogonys cinctus - Aus
Banded lapwing, Vanellus tricolor - Aus
Masked lapwing, Vanellus miles - Aus
Northern lapwing, Vanellus vanellus
Blacksmith lapwing, Vanellus armatus

Scolopacidae 
Latham's snipe, Gallinago hardwickii - Aus
Pin-tailed snipe, Gallinago stenura - Aus
Swinhoe's snipe, Gallinago megala - Aus
Chatham Island snipe, Coenocorypha pusilla - NZ
Subantarctic snipe, Coenocorypha aucklandica - NZ
Snares snipe, Coenocorypha huegeli - NZ
Black-tailed godwit, Limosa limosa - Aus
Hudsonian godwit, Limosa haemastica - Aus
Bar-tailed godwit, Limosa lapponica - Aus
Little curlew, Numenius minutus - Aus
Whimbrel, Numenius phaeopus - Aus
Bristle-thighed curlew, Numenius tahitiensis
Eastern curlew, Numenius madagascariensis - Aus
Upland sandpiper, Bartramia longicauda - Aus
Spotted redshank, Tringa erythropus - Aus
Common redshank, Tringa totanus - Aus
Marsh sandpiper, Tringa stagnatilis - Aus
Common greenshank, Tringa nebularia - Aus
Lesser yellowlegs, Tringa flavipes - Aus
Solitary sandpiper, Tringa solitaria
Green sandpiper, Tringa ochropus - Aus
Wood sandpiper, Tringa glareola - Aus
Terek sandpiper, Xenus cinereus - Aus
Common sandpiper, Actitis hypoleucos - Aus
Grey-tailed tattler, Tringa brevipes - Aus
Wandering tattler, Tringa incana - Aus
Ruddy turnstone, Arenaria interpres - Aus
Asian dowitcher, Limnodromus semipalmatus - Aus
Great knot, Calidris tenuirostris - Aus
Red knot, Calidris canutus - Aus, NZ
Sanderling, Calidris alba - Aus
Western sandpiper, Calidris mauri
Little stint, Calidris minuta - Aus
Red-necked stint, Calidris ruficollis - Aus
Long-toed stint, Calidris subminuta - Aus
Least sandpiper, Calidris minutilla
White-rumped sandpiper, Calidris fuscicollis - Aus
Baird's sandpiper, Calidris bairdii - Aus
Pectoral sandpiper, Calidris melanotos - Aus
Sharp-tailed sandpiper, Calidris acuminata - Aus
Dunlin, Calidris alpina - Aus
Curlew sandpiper, Calidris ferruginea - Aus
Stilt sandpiper, Micropalama himantopus - Aus
Buff-breasted sandpiper, Tryngites subruficollis - Aus
Broad-billed sandpiper, Limicola falcinellus - Aus
Ruff, Philomachus pugnax - Aus
Wilson's phalarope, Phalaropus tricolor - Aus
Red-necked phalarope, Phalaropus lobatus - Aus
Grey phalarope, Phalaropus fulicarius - Aus

Glareolidae 
Oriental pratincole, Glareola maldivarum - Aus
Australian pratincole, Stiltia isabella - Aus

Laridae 
Great skua, Catharacta skua
South polar skua, Catharacta maccormicki - Aus
Pomarine jaeger, Stercorarius pomarinus - Aus
Arctic jaeger, Stercorarius parasiticus - Aus, NZ
Long-tailed jaeger, Stercorarius longicauda - Aus
Pacific gull, Larus pacificus - Aus
Black-tailed gull, Larus crassirostris - Aus
Kelp gull, Larus dominicanus - Aus, NZ
Silver gull, Chroicocephalus novaehollandiae - Aus, NZ
Black-billed gull, Chroicocephalus bulleri - NZ
Black-headed gull, Chroicocephalus ridibundus - Aus
Laughing gull, Leucophaeus atricilla - Aus
Franklin's gull, Leucophaeus pipixcan - Aus
Sabine's gull, Xema sabini - Aus
Gull-billed tern, Gelochelidon nilotica - Aus
Australian tern, Gelochelidon macrotarsa - Aus
Caspian tern, Hydroprogne caspia - Aus, NZ
Lesser crested tern, Thalasseus bengalensis - Aus
Greater crested tern, Thalasseus bergii - Aus
Roseate tern, Sterna dougallii - Aus
White-fronted tern, Sterna striata - Aus
Black-naped tern, Sterna sumatrana - Aus
Common tern, Sterna hirundo - Aus
Arctic tern, Sterna paradisaea - Aus
Antarctic tern, Sterna vittata - Aus
Kerguelen tern, Sterna virgata
Little tern, Sternula albifrons - Aus
Fairy tern, Sternula nereis - Aus
Bridled tern, Onychoprion anaethetus - Aus
Sooty tern, Onychoprion fuscatus - Aus
Black-fronted tern, Chlidonias albostriatus - NZ
Whiskered tern, Chlidonias hybrida - Aus
White-winged tern, Chlidonias leucopterus - Aus
Black tern, Chlidonias niger - Aus
Common noddy, Anous stolidus - Aus
Black noddy, Anous minutus - Aus
Lesser noddy, Anous tenuirostris - Aus
Grey ternlet, Procelsterna cerulea - Aus
White tern, Gygis alba - Aus

Columbiformes

Columbidae 
Rock dove, Columba livia - Aus, NZ, introduced
White-throated pigeon, Columba vitiensis - Aus
White-headed pigeon, Columba leucomela - Aus
Laughing dove, Spilopelia senegalensis - Aus, introduced
Spotted dove, Spilopelia chinensis - Aus, NZ, introduced
Barbary dove, Streptopelia risoria - Aus, NZ, introduced
Brown cuckoo-dove, Macropygia phasianella - Aus
Pacific emerald dove, Chalcophaps longirostris - Aus
Common bronzewing, Phaps chalcoptera - Aus
Brush bronzewing, Phaps elegans - Aus
Flock bronzewing, Phaps histrionica - Aus
Crested pigeon, Ocyphaps lophotes - Aus
Spinifex pigeon, Geophaps plumifera - Aus
Partridge pigeon, Geophaps smithii - Aus
Squatter pigeon, Geophaps scripta - Aus
White-quilled rock pigeon, Petrophassa albipennis - Aus
Chestnut-quilled rock pigeon, Petrophassa rufipennis - Aus
Diamond dove, Geopelia cuneata - Aus
Peaceful dove, Geopelia striata - Aus
Bar-shouldered dove, Geopelia humeralis - Aus
Wonga pigeon, Leucosarcia melanoleuca - Aus
Norfolk ground dove, Gallicolumba norfolciensis - Aus, extinct
Black-banded fruit dove, Ptilinopus alligator - Aus
Wompoo fruit dove, Ptilinopus magnificus - Aus
Superb fruit dove, Ptilinopus superbus - Aus
Rose-crowned fruit dove, Ptilinopus regina - Aus
Elegant imperial pigeon, Ducula concinna - Aus
Christmas imperial pigeon, Ducula whartoni - Aus
Collared imperial pigeon, Ducula mullerii - Aus
Torresian imperial pigeon, Ducula spilorrhoa - Aus
Topknot pigeon, Lopholaimus antarcticus - Aus
New Zealand pigeon, Hemiphaga novaeseelandiae - Aus, NZ

Psittaciformes

Strigopidae 
Kea, Nestor notabilis - NZ
New Zealand kaka, Nestor meridionalis - NZ
Norfolk kaka, Nestor productus - Aus
Kakapo, Strigops habroptilus - NZ

Cacatuidae 
Palm cockatoo, Probosciger aterrimus - Aus
Red-tailed black cockatoo, Calyptorhynchus banksii - Aus
Glossy black cockatoo, Calyptorhynchus lathami - Aus
Yellow-tailed black cockatoo, Calyptorhynchus funereus - Aus
Short-billed black cockatoo, Calyptorhynchus latirostris - Aus
Long-billed black cockatoo, Calyptorhynchus baudinii - Aus
Gang-gang cockatoo, Callocephalon fimbriatum - Aus
Galah, Eolophus roseicapilla - Aus
Major Mitchell's cockatoo, Lophochroa leadbeateri - Aus
Long-billed corella, Cacatua tenuirostris - Aus
Western corella, Cacatua pastinator - Aus
Little corella, Cacatua sanguinea - Aus
Sulphur-crested cockatoo, Cacatua galerita - Aus, NZ
Cockatiel, Nymphicus hollandicus - Aus

Psittacidae 
Rainbow lorikeet, Trichoglossus haematodus - Aus
Scaly-breasted lorikeet, Trichoglossus chlorolepidotus - Aus
Varied lorikeet, Psitteuteles versicolor - Aus
Musk lorikeet, Glossopsitta concinna - Aus
Little lorikeet, Glossopsitta pusilla - Aus
Purple-crowned lorikeet, Glossopsitta porphyrocephala - Aus
Eclectus parrot, Eclectus roratus - Aus
Red-cheeked parrot, Geoffroyus geoffroyi - Aus
Double-eyed fig parrot, Cyclopsitta diophthalma - Aus
Australian king parrot, Alisterus scapularis - Aus
Red-winged parrot, Aprosmictus erythropterus - Aus
Superb parrot, Polytelis swainsonii - Aus
Regent parrot, Polytelis anthopeplus - Aus
Princess parrot, Polytelis alexandrae - Aus
Green rosella, Platycercus caledonicus - Aus
Crimson rosella, Platycercus elegans - Aus
Eastern rosella, Platycercus eximius - Aus
Pale-headed rosella, Platycercus adscitus - Aus
Northern rosella, Platycercus venustus - Aus
Western rosella, Platycercus icterotis - Aus
Australian ringneck, Barnardius zonarius - Aus
Red-capped parrot, Purpureicephalus spurius - Aus
Blue bonnet, Northiella haematogaster - Aus
Swift parrot, Lathamus discolor - Aus
Red-rumped parrot, Psephotus haematonotus - Aus
Mulga parrot, Psephotus varius - Aus
Golden-shouldered parrot, Psephotus chrysopterygius - Aus
Hooded parrot, Psephotus dissimilis - Aus
Paradise parrot, Psephotus pulcherrimus - Aus
Antipodes parakeet, Cyanoramphus unicolor - NZ
Red-fronted parakeet, Cyanoramphus novaezelandiae - Aus, NZ
Yellow-crowned parakeet, Cyanoramphus auriceps - NZ
Budgerigar, Melopsittacus undulatus - Aus
Bourke's parrot, Neophema bourkii - Aus
Blue-winged parrot, Neophema chrysostoma - Aus
Elegant parrot, Neophema elegans - Aus
Rock parrot, Neophema petrophila - Aus
Orange-bellied parrot, Neophema chrysogaster - Aus
Turquoise parrot, Neophema pulchella - Aus
Scarlet-chested parrot, Neophema splendida - Aus
Eastern ground parrot, Pezoporus wallicus - Aus
Western ground parrot, Pezoporus flaviventris - Aus
Night parrot, Pezoporus occidentalis - Aus

Cuculiformes

Cuculidae 
Common cuckoo, Cuculus canorus
African cuckoo, Cuculus gularis
Oriental cuckoo, Cuculus optatus - Aus
Pallid cuckoo, Cuculus pallidus - Aus
Brush cuckoo, Cuculus variolosus - Aus
Chestnut-breasted cuckoo, Cacomantis castaneiventris - Aus
Fan-tailed cuckoo, Cacomantis flabelliformis - Aus
Black-eared cuckoo, Chrysococcyx osculans - Aus
Horsfield's bronze cuckoo, Chrysococcyx basalis - Aus
Shining bronze cuckoo, Chrysococcyx lucidus - Aus, NZ
Little bronze cuckoo, Chrysococcyx minutillus - Aus
Gould's bronze cuckoo, Chrysococcyx russatus - Aus
Pacific koel, Eudynamys orientalis - Aus
Long-tailed cuckoo, Eudynamys taitensis - Aus, NZ
Channel-billed cuckoo, Scythrops novaehollandiae - Aus

Centropodidae 
Pheasant coucal, Centropus phasianinus - Aus

Strigiformes

Strigidae 
Buffy fish owl, Ketupa ketupu
Little owl, Athene noctua
Powerful owl, Ninox strenua - Aus
Rufous owl, Ninox rufa - Aus
Barking owl, Ninox connivens - Aus
Australian boobook, Ninox boobook - Aus 
Morepork, Ninox novaeseelandiae - Aus, NZ
Brown hawk-owl, Ninox scutulata - Aus
Christmas Island hawk-owl, Ninox natalis - Aus
Laughing owl, Sceloglaux albifacies

Tytonidae 
Greater sooty owl, Tyto tenebricosa - Aus
Lesser sooty owl, Tyto multipunctata - Aus
Masked owl, Tyto novaehollandiae - Aus
Barn owl, Tyto alba - Aus
Grass owl, Tyto longimembris - Aus

Caprimulgiformes

Podargidae 
Tawny frogmouth, Podargus strigoides - Aus
Papuan frogmouth, Podargus papuensis - Aus
Marbled frogmouth, Podargus ocellatus - Aus

Caprimulgidae 
White-throated nightjar, Eurostopodus mystacalis - Aus
Spotted nightjar, Eurostopodus argus - Aus
Large-tailed nightjar, Caprimulgus macrurus - Aus
Savanna nightjar, Caprimulgus affinis - Aus

Aegothelidae 
Australian owlet-nightjar, Aegotheles cristatus - Aus

Apodiformes

Apodidae 
Glossy swiftlet, Collocalia esculenta - Aus
White-rumped swiftlet, Collocalia spodiopygius - Aus
Uniform swiftlet, Collocalia vanikorensis - Aus
White-throated needletail, Hirundapus caudacutus - Aus
Common swift, Apus apus - NZ
Pacific swift, Apus pacificus - Aus
House swift, Apus affinis - Aus

Coraciiformes

Alcedinidae 
Azure kingfisher, Ceyx azureus - Aus
Little kingfisher, Ceyx pusillus - Aus
Buff-breasted paradise kingfisher, Tanysiptera sylvia - Aus
Laughing kookaburra, Dacelo novaeguineae - Aus
Blue-winged kookaburra, Dacelo leachii - Aus
Yellow-billed kingfisher, Syma torotoro - Aus
Forest kingfisher, Todiramphus macleayii - Aus
Red-backed kingfisher, Todiramphus pyrrhopygia - Aus
Sacred kingfisher, Todiramphus sanctus - Aus
Torresian kingfisher, Todiramphus sordidus - Aus

Meropidae 
Rainbow bee-eater, Merops ornatus - Aus

Coraciidae 
Broad-billed roller, Eurystomus glaucurus
Dollarbird, Eurystomus orientalis - Aus

Passeriformes

Tyrannidae 
Eastern kingbird, Tyrannus tyrannus
Dark-faced ground tyrant, Muscisaxicola macloviana

Acanthisittidae 
Rifleman, Acanthisitta chloris - NZ
Bush wren, Xenicus longipes - NZ
Rock wren, Xenicus gilviventris - NZ
Lyall's wren, Traversia lyalli - NZ

Pittidae 
Papuan pitta, Erythropitta macklotii - Aus
Blue-winged pitta, Pitta moluccensis - Aus
Noisy pitta, Pitta versicolor - Aus
Rainbow pitta, Pitta iris - Aus

Menuridae 
Albert's lyrebird, Menura alberti - Aus
Superb lyrebird, Menura novaehollandiae - Aus

Atrichornithidae 
Rufous scrubbird, Atrichornis rufescens - Aus
Noisy scrubbird, Atrichornis clamosus - Aus

Climacteridae 
White-throated treecreeper, Cormobates leucophaeus - Aus
White-browed treecreeper, Climacteris affinis - Aus
Red-browed treecreeper, Climacteris erythrops - Aus
Brown treecreeper, Climacteris picumnus - Aus
Black-tailed treecreeper, Climacteris melanura - Aus
Rufous treecreeper, Climacteris rufa - Aus

Maluridae 
Purple-crowned fairywren, Malurus coronatus - Aus
Superb fairywren, Malurus cyaneus - Aus
Splendid fairywren, Malurus splendens - Aus
Variegated fairywren, Malurus lamberti - Aus
Lovely fairywren, Malurus amabilis - Aus
Blue-breasted fairywren, Malurus pulcherrimus - Aus
Red-winged fairywren, Malurus elegans - Aus
White-winged fairywren, Malurus leucopterus - Aus
Red-backed fairywren, Malurus melanocephalus - Aus
Southern emu-wren, Stipiturus malachurus - Aus
Mallee emu-wren, Stipiturus mallee - Aus
Rufous-crowned emu-wren, Stipiturus ruficeps - Aus
Grey grasswren, Amytornis barbatus - Aus
Black grasswren, Amytornis housei - Aus
White-throated grasswren, Amytornis woodwardi - Aus
Carpentarian grasswren, Amytornis dorotheae - Aus
Striated grasswren, Amytornis striatus - Aus
Short-tailed grasswren, Amytornis merrotsyi - Aus
Eyrean grasswren, Amytornis goyderi - Aus
Thick-billed grasswren, Amytornis textilis - Aus
Dusky grasswren, Amytornis purnelli - Aus
Kalkadoon grasswren, Amytornis ballarae - Aus

Meliphagidae 
Red wattlebird, Anthochaera carunculata - Aus, NZ
Yellow wattlebird, Anthochaera paradoxa - Aus
Little wattlebird, Anthochaera chrysoptera - Aus
Western wattlebird, Anthochaera lunulata - Aus
Spiny-cheeked honeyeater, Acanthagenys rufogularis - Aus
Striped honeyeater, Plectorhyncha lanceolata - Aus
Helmeted friarbird, Philemon buceroides - Aus
Silver-crowned friarbird, Philemon argenticeps - Aus
Noisy friarbird, Philemon corniculatus - Aus
Little friarbird, Philemon citreogularis - Aus
Regent honeyeater, Anthochaera phrygia - Aus
Blue-faced honeyeater, Entomyzon cyanotis - Aus
Bell miner, Manorina melanophrys - Aus
Noisy miner, Manorina melanocephala - Aus
Yellow-throated miner, Manorina flavigula - Aus
Black-eared miner, Manorina melanotis - Aus
Macleay's honeyeater, Xanthotis macleayana - Aus
Tawny-breasted honeyeater, Xanthotis flaviventer - Aus
Lewin's honeyeater, Meliphaga lewinii - Aus
Yellow-spotted honeyeater, Meliphaga notata - Aus
Graceful honeyeater, Meliphaga gracilis - Aus
White-lined honeyeater, Meliphaga albilineata - Aus
Bridled honeyeater, Bolemoreus frenatus - Aus
Eungella honeyeater, Bolemoreus hindwoodi - Aus
Yellow-faced honeyeater, Caligavis chrysops - Aus
Singing honeyeater, Gavicalis virescens - Aus
Varied honeyeater, Gavicalis versicolor - Aus
Mangrove honeyeater, Gavicalis fasciogularis - Aus
White-gaped honeyeater, Stomiopera unicolor - Aus
Yellow honeyeater, Stomiopera flava - Aus
White-eared honeyeater, Nesoptilotis leucotis - Aus
Yellow-throated honeyeater, Nesoptilotis flavicollis - Aus
Yellow-tufted honeyeater, Lichenostomus melanops - Aus
Purple-gaped honeyeater, Lichenostomus cratitius - Aus
Grey-headed honeyeater, Ptilotula keartlandi - Aus
Yellow-plumed honeyeater, Ptilotula ornata - Aus
Grey-fronted honeyeater, Ptilotula plumula - Aus
Fuscous honeyeater, Ptilotula fusca - Aus
Yellow-tinted honeyeater, Ptilotula flavescens - Aus
White-plumed honeyeater, Ptilotula penicillata - Aus
Black-chinned honeyeater, Melithreptus gularis - Aus
Strong-billed honeyeater, Melithreptus validirostris - Aus
Brown-headed honeyeater, Melithreptus brevirostris - Aus
White-throated honeyeater, Melithreptus albogularis - Aus
White-naped honeyeater, Melithreptus lunatus - Aus
Black-headed honeyeater, Melithreptus affinis - Aus
Stitchbird, Notiomystis cincta - NZ
Green-backed honeyeater, Glycichaera fallax - Aus
Brown honeyeater, Lichmera indistincta - Aus
White-streaked honeyeater, Trichodere cockerelli - Aus
Painted honeyeater, Grantiella picta - Aus
Crescent honeyeater, Phylidonyris pyrrhoptera - Aus
New Holland honeyeater, Phylidonyris novaehollandiae - Aus
White-cheeked honeyeater, Phylidonyris nigra - Aus
Tawny-crowned honeyeater, Gliciphila melanops - Aus
White-fronted honeyeater, Purnella albifrons - Aus
Brown-backed honeyeater, Ramsayornis modestus - Aus
Bar-breasted honeyeater, Ramsayornis fasciatus - Aus
Rufous-banded honeyeater, Conopophila albogularis - Aus
Rufous-throated honeyeater, Conopophila rufogularis - Aus
Grey honeyeater, Conopophila whitei - Aus
Eastern spinebill, Acanthorhynchus tenuirostris - Aus
Western spinebill, Acanthorhynchus superciliosus - Aus
Banded honeyeater, Cissomela pectoralis - Aus
Black honeyeater, Sugomel niger - Aus
Pied honeyeater, Certhionyx variegatus - Aus
Dusky honeyeater, Myzomela obscura - Aus
Red-headed honeyeater, Myzomela erythrocephala - Aus
Scarlet honeyeater, Myzomela sanguinolenta - Aus
Bellbird, Anthornis melanura - NZ
Tui, Prosthemadera novaeseelandiae - NZ
Crimson chat, Epthianura tricolor - Aus
Orange chat, Epthianura aurifrons - Aus
Yellow chat, Epthianura crocea - Aus
White-fronted chat, Epthianura albifrons - Aus
Gibberbird, Ashbyia lovensis - Aus

Pardalotidae 
Spotted pardalote, Pardalotus punctatus - Aus
Forty-spotted pardalote, Pardalotus quadragintus - Aus
Red-browed pardalote, Pardalotus rubricatus - Aus
Striated pardalote, Pardalotus striatus - Aus

Dasyornithidae 
Eastern bristlebird, Dasyornis brachypterus - Aus
Rufous bristlebird, Dasyornis broadbenti - Aus
Western bristlebird, Dasyornis longirostris - Aus

Acanthizidae 
Pilotbird, Pycnoptilus floccosus - Aus
Rockwarbler, Origma solitaria - Aus
Fernwren, Oreoscopus gutturalis - Aus
Yellow-throated scrubwren, Sericornis citreogularis - Aus
White-browed scrubwren, Sericornis frontalis - Aus
Tasmanian scrubwren, Sericornis humilis - Aus
Atherton scrubwren, Sericornis keri - Aus
Large-billed scrubwren, Sericornis magnirostris - Aus
Tropical scrubwren, Sericornis beccarii - Aus
Scrubtit, Acanthornis magnus - Aus
Chestnut-rumped heathwren, Hylacola pyrrhopygia - Aus
Shy heathwren, Hylacola cauta - Aus
Striated fieldwren, Calamanthus fuliginosus - Aus
Rufous fieldwren, Calamanthus campestris - Aus
Redthroat, Pyrrholaemus brunneus - Aus
Speckled warbler, Chthonicola sagittatus - Aus
Weebill, Smicrornis brevirostris - Aus
Brown gerygone, Gerygone mouki - Aus
Grey warbler, Gerygone igata - NZ
Chatham Island warbler, Gerygone albofrontata - NZ
Norfolk Island gerygone, Gerygone modesta - Aus
Dusky gerygone, Gerygone tenebrosa - Aus
Mangrove gerygone, Gerygone levigaster - Aus
Western gerygone, Gerygone fusca - Aus
Lord Howe gerygone, Gerygone insularis - Aus
Large-billed gerygone, Gerygone magnirostris - Aus
Green-backed gerygone, Gerygone chloronotus - Aus
Fairy gerygone, Gerygone palpebrosa - Aus
White-throated gerygone, Gerygone olivacea - Aus
Mountain thornbill, Acanthiza katherina - Aus
Brown thornbill, Acanthiza pusilla - Aus
Inland thornbill, Acanthiza apicalis - Aus
Tasmanian thornbill, Acanthiza ewingii - Aus
Chestnut-rumped thornbill, Acanthiza uropygialis - Aus
Slaty-backed thornbill, Acanthiza robustirostris - Aus
Western thornbill, Acanthiza inornata - Aus
Buff-rumped thornbill, Acanthiza reguloides - Aus
Slender-billed thornbill, Acanthiza iredalei - Aus
Yellow-rumped thornbill, Acanthiza chrysorrhoa - Aus
Yellow thornbill, Acanthiza nana - Aus
Striated thornbill, Acanthiza lineata - Aus
Southern whiteface, Aphelocephala leucopsis - Aus
Chestnut-breasted whiteface, Aphelocephala pectoralis - Aus
Banded whiteface, Aphelocephala nigricincta - Aus

Petroicidae 
Jacky winter, Microeca fascinans - Aus
Lemon-bellied flycatcher, Microeca flavigaster - Aus
Yellow-legged flycatcher, Microeca griseoceps - Aus
Scarlet robin, Petroica multicolor - Aus
New Zealand tomtit, Petroica macrocephala - NZ
Red-capped robin, Petroica goodenovii - Aus
Flame robin, Petroica phoenicea - Aus
Rose robin, Petroica rosea - Aus
Pink robin, Petroica rodinogaster - Aus
South Island robin, Petroica australis - NZ
North Island robin, Petroica longipes - NZ
Black robin, Petroica traversi - NZ
Hooded robin, Melanodryas cucullata - Aus
Dusky robin, Melanodryas vittata - Aus
Pale-yellow robin, Tregellasia capito - Aus
White-faced robin, Tregellasia leucops - Aus
Eastern yellow robin, Eopsaltria australis - Aus
Western yellow robin, Eopsaltria griseogularis - Aus
White-breasted robin, Eopsaltria georgiana - Aus
Mangrove robin, Eopsaltria pulverulenta - Aus
White-browed robin, Poecilodryas superciliosa - Aus
Grey-headed robin, Heteromyias cinereifrons - Aus
Northern scrub robin, Drymodes superciliaris - Aus
Southern scrub robin, Drymodes brunneopygia - Aus

Orthonychidae 
Logrunner, Orthonyx temminckii - Aus
Chowchilla, Orthonyx spaldingii - Aus

Pomatostomidae 
Grey-crowned babbler, Pomatostomus temporalis - Aus
White-browed babbler, Pomatostomus superciliosus - Aus
Hall's babbler, Pomatostomus halli - Aus
Chestnut-crowned babbler, Pomatostomus ruficeps - Aus

Cinclosomatidae 
Eastern whipbird, Psophodes olivaceus - Aus
Western whipbird, Psophodes nigrogularis - Aus
Chirruping wedgebill, Psophodes cristatus - Aus
Chiming wedgebill, Psophodes occidentalis - Aus
Spotted quail-thrush, Cinclosoma punctatum - Aus
Chestnut quail-thrush, Cinclosoma castanotus - Aus
Cinnamon quail-thrush, Cinclosoma cinnamomeum - Aus
Nullarbor quail-thrush, Cinclosoma alisteri - Aus
Chestnut-breasted quail-thrush, Cinclosoma castaneothorax - Aus
Western quail-thrush, Cinclosoma marginatum - Aus

Neosittidae 
Varied sittella, Daphoenositta chrysoptera - Aus

Mohouidae 
Whitehead, Mohoua albicilla - NZ
Yellowhead, Mohoua ochrocephala - NZ
Brown creeper, Mohoua novaeseelandiae - NZ

Pachycephalidae 
Crested shrike-tit, Falcunculus frontatus - Aus
Olive whistler, Pachycephala olivacea - Aus
Red-lored whistler, Pachycephala rufogularis - Aus
Gilbert's whistler, Pachycephala inornata - Aus
Australian golden whistler, Pachycephala pectoralis - Aus
Mangrove golden whistler, Pachycephala melanura - Aus
Western whistler, Pachycephala occidentalis - Aus
Grey whistler, Pachycephala simplex - Aus
Rufous whistler, Pachycephala rufiventris - Aus
White-breasted whistler, Pachycephala lanioides - Aus
Little shrike-thrush, Colluricincla megarhyncha - Aus
Bower's shrike-thrush, Colluricincla boweri - Aus
Sandstone shrike-thrush, Colluricincla woodwardi - Aus
Grey shrike-thrush, Colluricincla harmonica - Aus

Oreoicidae 
Crested bellbird, Oreoica gutturalis - Aus

Monarchidae 
Yellow-breasted boatbill, Machaerirhynchus flaviventer - Aus
Black-faced monarch, Monarcha melanopsis - Aus
Black-winged monarch, Monarcha frater - Aus
Spectacled monarch, Symposiachrus trivirgatus - Aus
White-eared monarch, Carterornis leucotis - Aus
Frilled monarch, Arses telescophthalmus - Aus
Pied monarch, Arses kaupi - Aus
Broad-billed flycatcher, Myiagra ruficollis - Aus
Leaden flycatcher, Myiagra rubecula - Aus
Satin flycatcher, Myiagra cyanoleuca - Aus
Shining flycatcher, Myiagra alecto - Aus
Restless flycatcher, Myiagra inquieta - Aus
Magpie-lark, Grallina cyanoleuca - Aus

Rhipiduridae 
Rufous fantail, Rhipidura rufifrons - Aus
New Zealand fantail, Rhipidura fuliginosa - NZ
Grey fantail, Rhipidura albiscapa - Aus
Mangrove grey fantail, Rhipidura phasiana - Aus
Northern fantail, Rhipidura rufiventris - Aus
Willie wagtail, Rhipidura leucophrys - Aus

Dicruridae 
Spangled drongo, Dicrurus bracteatus - Aus

Campephagidae 
Black-faced cuckooshrike, Coracina novaehollandiae - Aus
Barred cuckooshrike, Coracina lineata - Aus
White-bellied cuckooshrike, Coracina papuensis - Aus
Cicadabird, Coracina tenuirostris - Aus
Ground cuckooshrike, Coracina maxima - Aus
White-winged triller, Lalage sueurii - Aus
Varied triller, Lalage leucomela - Aus
Long-tailed triller, Lalage leucopyga

Oriolidae 
Yellow oriole, Oriolus flavocinctus - Aus
Olive-backed oriole, Oriolus sagittatus - Aus
Australasian figbird, Sphecotheres vieilloti - Aus
Piopio, Turnagra capensis - NZ

Artamidae 
White-breasted woodswallow, Artamus leucorynchus - Aus
Masked woodswallow, Artamus personatus - Aus, NZ
White-browed woodswallow, Artamus superciliosus - Aus, NZ
Black-faced woodswallow, Artamus cinereus - Aus
Dusky woodswallow, Artamus cyanopterus - Aus
Little woodswallow, Artamus minor - Aus
Black butcherbird, Cracticus quoyi - Aus
Grey butcherbird, Cracticus torquatus - Aus
Silver-backed butcherbird, Cracticus argenteus - Aus
Black-backed butcherbird, Cracticus mentalis - Aus
Pied butcherbird, Cracticus nigrogularis - Aus
Pied currawong, Strepera graculina - Aus
Black currawong, Strepera fuliginosa - Aus
Grey currawong, Strepera versicolor - Aus
Australian magpie, Gymnorhina tibicen - Aus, NZ

Paradisaeidae 
Paradise riflebird, Ptiloris paradiseus - Aus
Victoria's riflebird, Ptiloris victoriae - Aus
Magnificent riflebird, Ptiloris magnificus - Aus
Trumpet manucode, Manucodia keraudrenii - Aus

Corvidae 
Rook, Corvus frugilegus - NZ, introduced
Australian raven, Corvus coronoides - Aus
Forest raven, Corvus tasmanicus - Aus
Little raven, Corvus mellori - Aus
Little crow, Corvus bennetti - Aus
Torresian crow, Corvus orru - Aus

Corcoracidae 
White-winged chough, Corcorax melanorhamphos - Aus
Apostlebird, Struthidea cinerea - Aus

Callaeidae 
South Island kōkako, Callaeas cinereus - NZ
North Island kōkako, Callaeas wilsoni - NZ
South Island saddleback, Philesturnus carunculatus - NZ
North Island saddleback, Philesturnus rufusater - NZ
Huia, Heteralocha acutirostris - NZ

Laniidae 
Brown shrike, Lanius cristatus - Aus
Red-backed shrike, Lanius collurio

Ptilonorhynchidae 
Spotted catbird, Ailuroedus melanotis - Aus
Green catbird, Ailuroedus crassirostris - Aus
Tooth-billed bowerbird, Scenopoeetes dentirostris - Aus
Golden bowerbird, Prionodura newtoniana - Aus
Regent bowerbird, Sericulus chrysocephalus - Aus
Satin bowerbird, Ptilonorhynchus violaceus - Aus
Spotted bowerbird, Chlamydera maculata - Aus
Western bowerbird, Chlamydera guttata - Aus
Great bowerbird, Chlamydera nuchalis - Aus
Fawn-breasted bowerbird, Chlamydera cerviniventris - Aus

Alaudidae 
Singing bushlark, Mirafra javanica - Aus
Skylark, Alauda arvensis - Aus

Motacillidae 
Richard's pipit, Anthus novaeseelandiae - Aus, NZ
Correndera pipit, Anthus correndera
Red-throated pipit, Anthus cervinus - Aus
Yellow wagtail, Motacilla flava - Aus
Citrine wagtail, Motacilla citreola - Aus
Grey wagtail, Motacilla cinerea - Aus
White wagtail, Motacilla alba - Aus
Black-backed wagtail, Motacilla lugens - Aus

Prunellidae 
Dunnock, Prunella modularis - NZ

Passeridae 
House sparrow, Passer domesticus - Aus, NZ, introduced
Eurasian tree sparrow, Passer montanus - Aus, introduced

Estrildidae 
Zebra finch, Taeniopygia guttata - Aus
Double-barred finch, Taeniopygia bichenovii - Aus
Long-tailed finch, Poephila acuticauda - Aus
Black-throated finch, Poephila cincta - Aus
Masked finch, Poephila personata - Aus
Crimson finch, Neochmia phaeton - Aus
Star finch, Neochmia ruficauda - Aus
Plum-headed finch, Neochmia modesta - Aus
Red-browed finch, Neochmia temporalis - Aus
Diamond firetail, Stagonopleura guttata - Aus
Beautiful firetail, Stagonopleura bella - Aus
Red-eared firetail, Stagonopleura oculata - Aus
Painted finch, Emblema pictum - Aus
Nutmeg mannikin, Lonchura punctulata - Aus
Yellow-rumped mannikin, Lonchura flaviprymna - Aus
Chestnut-breasted mannikin, Lonchura castaneothorax - Aus
Java sparrow, Lonchura oryzivora - Aus
Pale-headed munia, Lonchura pallida - Aus
Pictorella mannikin, Heteromunia pectoralis - Aus
Blue-faced parrotfinch, Erythrura trichroa - Aus
Gouldian finch, Erythrura gouldiae - Aus

Fringillidae 
Common chaffinch, Fringilla coelebs - Aus, NZ, introduced
European greenfinch, Chloris chloris - Aus, NZ, introduced
European goldfinch, Carduelis carduelis - Aus, NZ, introduced
Common redpoll, Acanthis flammea - Aus, NZ, introduced
Long-tailed meadowlark, Sturnella loyca - introduced

Emberizidae 
Yellowhammer, Emberiza citrinella - Aus, NZ, introduced
Cirl bunting, Emberiza cirlus - NZ, introduced

Nectariniidae 
Yellow-bellied sunbird, Nectarinia jugularis - Aus

Dicaeidae 
Mistletoebird, Dicaeum hirundinaceum - Aus
Red-capped flowerpecker, Dicaeum geelvinkianum - Aus

Hirundinidae 
White-rumped swallow, Tachycineta leucorrhoa
White-backed swallow, Cheramoeca leucosternus - Aus
Sand martin, Riparia riparia
Barn swallow, Hirundo rustica - Aus
Welcome swallow, Hirundo neoxena - Aus
Red-rumped swallow, Hirundo daurica - Aus
Tree martin, Hirundo nigricans - Aus
Fairy martin, Hirundo ariel - Aus
Asian house martin, Hirundo dasypus - Aus

Pycnonotidae 
Red-whiskered bulbul, Pycnonotus jocosus - Aus

Acrocephalidae 
Clamorous reed warbler, Acrocephalus stentoreus - Aus
Oriental reed warbler, Acrocephalus orientalis - Aus

Phylloscopidae 
Willow warbler, Phylloscopus trochilus
Arctic warbler, Phylloscopus borealis - Aus

Locustellidae 
Tawny grassbird, Megalurus timoriensis - Aus
Little grassbird, Megalurus gramineus - Aus
Fernbird, Megalurus punctatus - NZ
Chatham fernbird, Megalurus rufescens - NZ
Spinifexbird, Megalurus carteri - Aus
Rufous songlark, Megalurus mathewsi - Aus
Brown songlark, Megalurus cruralis - Aus

Cisticolidae 
Zitting cisticola, Cisticola juncidis - Aus
Golden-headed cisticola, Cisticola exilis - Aus

Zosteropidae 
Christmas white-eye, Zosterops natalis - Aus
Pale white-eye, Zosterops citrinellus - Aus
Yellow white-eye, Zosterops luteus - Aus
Silvereye, Zosterops lateralis - Aus, NZ
Robust white-eye, Zosterops strenuus - Aus
Slender-billed white-eye, Zosterops tenuirostris - Aus
White-chested white-eye, Zosterops albogularis - Aus

Turdidae 
Bassian thrush, Zoothera lunulata - Aus
Russet-tailed thrush, Zoothera heinei - Aus
Blackbird, Turdus merula - Aus
Island thrush, Turdus poliocephalus - Aus
Song thrush, Turdus philomelos - Aus

Muscicapidae 
Blue rock thrush, Monticola solitarius - Aus
Narcissus flycatcher, Ficedula narcissina - Aus
Blue-and-white flycatcher, Cyanoptila cyanomelana - Aus
Mountain wheatear, Oenanthe monticola

Sturnidae 
Tasman starling, Aplonis fusca - Aus
Metallic starling, Aplonis metallica - Aus
Singing starling, Aplonis cantoroides - Aus
Common starling, Sturnus vulgaris - Aus, NZ, introduced
Daurian starling, Agropsar sturninus
Common myna, Acridotheres tristis - Aus, NZ, introduced

See also 
 List of Australian birds
 List of New Zealand birds
 List of birds of Antarctica
 Birds of Australia

References 

'
Australia, New Zealand and Antarctica

ja:オーストラリアの野鳥一覧